The 1947 Massachusetts Statesmen football team was an American football team that represented the University of Massachusetts in the Yankee Conference during the 1947 college football season. In its third season under head coach Thomas Eck, the team compiled a 3–4–1 record (0–1–1 in conference play). The team played its home games at Alumni Field in Amherst, Massachusetts.

The Yankee Conference began play in 1947, as Massachusetts joined the other land-grant colleges in New England to form the new conference.

Schedule

References

Massachusetts
UMass Minutemen football seasons
Massachusetts State Aggies football